A monotown (a calque from Russian моногород, monogorod; gorod meaning "town") is a city/town whose economy is dominated by a single industry or company. This means that most employments (except for service to residents like schools and shops) are by the main company.

Russia
The term monotown is especially often used in Russia, where the Soviet planned economy created hundreds of monotowns in supposedly rational locations, often in geographically inhospitable areas. The situation in many of Russia's monotowns is highly problematic: they are entirely dependent on the competitiveness of a single company or factory, very inflexible and based on Soviet-era economics and technologies.

Most monotowns were built essentially as residential extensions of particular enterprises (so called "city-forming enterprises"), their population being either engaged in the city-forming enterprise's manufacturing process, or providing various services to the former group. The core workforce in monotowns was largely formed by the centralized workforce distribution system (people being assigned to an enterprise for a certain number of years after completing the education - which essentially replaced tuition payment, or transferred from other enterprises) rather than by spontaneous migration processes, as it was the case in less specialized towns. Combined, these factors led to narrow and inflexible economies and an immobile workforce, by the standards of the market economy newly introduced into the country in the late 1980s or early 1990s.

By the time the city-forming enterprises were privatized and / or liquidated, the workforce management system had already ceased to exist, so the leftover workforce could not be transferred to other regions retaining the living conditions, as it was done during the Soviet era following the liquidation of a no longer needed enterprise. Monotown residents proved to be hesitant to move away on their own and seek work elsewhere as well, mostly because the state housing distribution system was almost dead at the time, and the very low market value of their real estate didn't let them count on minimally comfortable apartments in any other developed town (the agricultural sector was and is even more economically depressed in most regions of Russia, making countryside largely unattractive for the town-dwellers).

History
According to a Russian government study conducted in 1999–2000, there were 467 cities and 332 smaller towns in Russia which could be classified as monotowns. The combined population of these towns was 25 million, or a sixth of the country's total population. The 900 monotown enterprises—most of them involved in heavy industries such as manufacturing, fuels, timber, pulp and metallurgy—accounted for more than 30% of industrial production.

The monotowns suffered greatly in the late-2000s recession, leading to mass unemployment in the cities. Having no other hope, people have only one option - to protest.

In one high-profile incident, in 2009 some 300 residents of the north-western town of Pikalyovo blocked a major highway to protest against large delays in the payments of wages. Prime Minister Vladimir Putin traveled to the city and ordered the owner of the city's dominant company BasEl Cement Pikalyovo, Oleg Deripaska to pay over 41 million rubles ($1.3 million) of wage arrears to the city's residents. The sum was paid out and the situation in the city calmed down, but questions remained about the long-term viability of the Pikalyovo plants.

As of 2018, the official list of Russian monotowns includes 319 populated places. Towns can be removed from the list, if the local economies are deemed to have become sufficiently diversified. In late 2017, 14 million Russians lived in officially designated monotowns. A Fund for the Development of Monotowns was established in 2014, to invest in infrastructure and promote economic diversification. The monotown list is divided into categories, depending on the socioeconomic situation. Monotowns are not necessarily economically stagnant: Norilsk has an above average employment rate, as well as relatively high salaries.

Examples
Russia's largest monotown is Tolyatti, which has a population of 700,000. It is home to the large AvtoVAZ factory, which in late 2008 employed 106,000 people. AvtoVAZ is Russia's largest carmaker, accounting for 1% of the country's GDP. As of 2014, AvtoVAZ is owned by Nissan-Renault, which uses even harsher workforce policies than the previous owner. However, the situation is somewhat helped by widespread small-scale car parts producers and other small car-oriented enterprises in the region, which are providing many additional workplaces.

Dalnegorsk, located in the Russian Far East, is a monotown with a population of nearly 40,000 people. The town's economy is completely dominated by two mining and metallurgy companies: JSC Bor and JSC Dalpolimetal, both subsidiaries of OOO UK Russian mining company (RGRK). They produce zinc and lead concentrates as well as boric acid colemanite.

Soviet Union and other post-Soviet states
The Soviet planned economy aimed to establish industrial facilities in rational locations, based on military, political, bureaucratic and economic criteria. The goal was to maximise regional specialisation. The dominant enterprise was responsible not only for production, but for providing social services to the population, such as housing, child care, etc.

After the dissolution of the Soviet Union, most of the monotowns' dominant enterprises were privatised, and consequently many of them had gone bankrupt by the end of the 1990s, either deliberately (usually it was more profitable to sell the property of an enterprise than to keep it functioning) or due to uncompetitiveness, caused by the shrinkage of the home market outside the consumer goods sector, unrestricted import of low-cost industrial wares from China, Turkey or other countries and the lack of long-term investments by the private owners, who were for the most part interested in quick money rather than development or modernization.

Private owners also mostly refused to provide social services to the populations of monotowns, referring to such practice as being "economically inefficient" - however, the government's attempt to delegate the responsibility of providing social services from the companies to the newly created local municipalities was mostly a failure, as they lacked resources to complete the transformation. That led to a radical decrease in quality of life in monotowns, which enjoyed higher-than-average wealth for the most part of the Soviet period.

See also
Company town
Mill town
College town

References

 
Economy of Russia
Russian words and phrases
Urban geography
Urban planning
Cities by type
Populated places by type
Economy of the Soviet Union
Urban studies and planning terminology